Robert Lee Henry (May 12, 1864 – July 9, 1931) was a Democratic member of the United States House of Representatives from Texas from 1897 to 1917.

Early life
Robert Lee Henry was the great-great-great grandson of Patrick Henry and was born in Linden, Texas on May 12, 1864. While a child, he attended public schools and moved to Bowie County in 1878 and to McLennan County in 1895. He was graduated from Southwestern University in Georgetown, Texas in 1885. He studied law and was admitted to the bar in 1886 and practiced for a short time in Texarkana, Texas. He was graduated from the University of Texas at Austin in 1887.

Political career
Henry was elected mayor of Texarkana in 1890 but resigned in 1891. He was then appointed First Assistant to the Attorney General of Texas 1891-1893 and Assistant Attorney General (1893–1896). He settled in Waco, Texas in 1895 and practiced law. He was elected as a Democrat to Congress from 1897-1917. From 1905-1907, Rep. Henry was Chairman of the House Democratic Caucus. He was also Chairman of the House Committee on Rules (1912–1917). A strong supporter of Woodrow Wilson in 1912, Henry was considered a progressive Democrat. He was not a candidate for renomination in 1916, but was an unsuccessful candidate for the Democratic nomination for United States Senator. He engaged in the practice of law in Waco, and again was an unsuccessful candidate for the Democratic nomination for United States Senator in 1922 and 1928. He moved to Houston, Texas in 1923 and resumed the practice of his profession.  Robert L. Henry died in Houston, on July 9, 1931, from a self-inflicted gunshot to his head in an apparent suicide. He was buried in Rose Hill Cemetery, Texarkana, Texas.

References

External links

 

1864 births
1931 suicides
Mayors of places in Texas
Texas lawyers
Southwestern University alumni
University of Texas at Austin alumni
People from Texarkana, Texas
American politicians who committed suicide
Suicides by firearm in Texas
People from Linden, Texas
Democratic Party members of the United States House of Representatives from Texas